Year's Best SF 10 is a science fiction anthology edited by David G. Hartwell and Kathryn Cramer that was published in 2005.  It is the tenth in the Year's Best SF series.

Contents

The book itself, as well as each of the stories, has a short
introduction by the editors.

Bradley Denton: "Sergeant Chip" (Originally in F&SF, 2004)
Gregory Benford: "First Commandment" (Originally in Sci Fiction, 2004)
 Glenn Grant: "Burning Day" (Originally in Island Dreams: Montreal Writers of the Fantastic, 2004)
Terry Bisson: "Scout's Honor" (Originally in Sci Fiction, 2004)
Pamela Sargent: "Venus Flowers at Night" (Originally in Microcosms, 2004)
Gene Wolfe: "Pulp Cover" (Originally in Asimov's, 2004)
Ken Liu: "The Algorithms for Love" (Originally in Strange Horizons, 2004)
Ray Vukcevich: "Glinky" (Originally in F&SF, 2004)
Janeen Webb: "Red City" (Originally in Synergy SF: New Science Fiction, 2004)
Jack McDevitt: "Act of God" (Originally in Microcosms, 2004)
Robert Reed: "Wealth" (Originally in Asimov's, 2004)
Matthew Hughes: "Mastermindless" (Originally in F&SF, 2004)
Jean-Claude Dunyach: "Time, as It Evaporates..." (Originally in The Night Orchid: Conan Doyle in Toulouse, 2004)
James Stoddard: "The Battle of York" (Originally in F&SF,  2004)
Liz Williams: "Loosestrife" (Originally in Interzone, 2004)
James Patrick Kelly: "The Dark Side of Town" (Originally in Asimov's, 2004)
Steven Utley: "Invisible Kingdom" (Originally in F&SF, 2004)
Sean McMullen: "The Cascade" (Originally in Agog! Terrific Tales, 2004)
Charles Coleman Finlay: "Pervert" (Originally in F&SF, 2004)
Steve Tomasula: "The Risk-Taking Gene as Expressed by Some Asian Subjects" (Originally in Denver Quarterly, 2004)
Neal Asher: "Strood" (Originally in Asimov's, 2004)
James L. Cambias: "The Eckener Alternative" (Originally in All Star Zeppelin Adventure Stories, 2004)
Brenda Cooper: "Savant Songs" (Originally in ''Analog, 2004)

External links 

2005 anthologies
Year's Best SF anthology series
Eos Books books
Science fiction anthologies
2000s science fiction works